You Kiddin' Me is an American hidden camera practical joke reality show series that premiered on September 22, 2018, on Facebook Watch.

Premise
You Kiddin' Me is described as "a comedic prank series where kids are in charge and celebrities must do everything their own children say. The series peeks into the family relationships of Hollywood stars as children prank their famous parents and an unsuspecting public."

Production
On March 2, 2018, it was announced that Facebook had given the production a series order for a first season consisting of ten episodes. Executive producers are set to include Kim Kardashian, Jennifer O'Connell, Brian Tannenbaum, Peter M. Cohen, and Melissa Stokes. Production companies involved in the series are slated to consist of Lionsgate Television. On September 7, 2018, it was announced that the series would premiere on September 22, 2018.

Episodes

Reception
In a negative review, The Ringers Kate Knibbs criticized the series saying, "Every era gets the Punk'd it deserves, and we are living through a spectacularly dumb and cruel moment. There’s something fitting about how Facebook, notorious for flooding the internet with viral garbage, debuted an accidental, weirdly cruel anti-comedy in its push for original content. You Kiddin’ Me?! isn't funny."

See also
 List of original programs distributed by Facebook Watch

References

External links

2010s American reality television series
2018 American television series debuts
2018 American television series endings
American non-fiction web series
English-language television shows
Facebook Watch original programming
Television series by Lionsgate Television